Kew Green is a large open space in Kew in west London. Owned by the Crown Estate, it is leased to the London Borough of Richmond upon Thames. It is roughly triangular in shape, and its open grassland, framed with broadleaf trees, extends to about thirty acres. Kew Green is overlooked by a mixture of period townhouses, historic buildings and commercial establishments. In the 1730s, Kew Green was a venue for cricket matches.

History and description
Most of the older houses in Kew are built round the Green and along the eastern side of the Kew Road looking towards Kew Gardens. The Green itself is a big triangular space. It is mentioned in a Parliamentary Survey of Richmond taken in 1649, and is there described as 'a piece of common or uninclosed ground called Kew Green, lying within the Township of Kew, conteyning about 20 acres.' An 18th-century view, taken from a meadow to the east, shows Kew Bridge on the right, a small irregular lake with an island to the left. A road led to the western point of the Green, where the palace was visible, a windmill behind it; and trees, the trunks engirdled by seats, grew opposite the square-built church which stood isolated on the Green. Some land at the end of the Green was enclosed by George IV, and a meadow east of the bridge was made common land, as part of a design, never carried out, of building a new palace at Kew in place of the Dutch House. In the early 19th century Sir Richard Phillips described the Green as 'a triangular area of about 30 acres bounded by dwelling-houses,' and another description of a slightly later date speaks of the 'well-built houses and noble trees' surrounding it.

Kew Green was in use as a venue for cricket by the 1730s and was used for a match between London and a Middlesex XI in 1732. A women's One Day International between New Zealand and Jamaica was scheduled to be held on the Green in 1973 as part of the inaugural Women's Cricket World Cup but the match was abandoned without a toss being made. The match would have been the first Women's One Day International match ever played. It is still used for club cricket today as the home of Kew Cricket Club.
 
Today the eastern and southwestern sides of the Green are residential; the northern side is largely residential, with a few pubs, restaurants, and the Herbarium Library; and a small number of commercial and retail buildings cluster in the southeast corner. To the north of the Green is Kew Bridge, carrying the busy South Circular Road, which in turn runs across the Green, dividing it into a large western part and a smaller eastern part. At the south end is St Anne's Church, Kew's parish church. At the west end of the Green is Elizabeth Gate, one of the two main entrances into Kew Gardens. Near the northeast corner is Kew Pond, originally thought to have been a natural pond fed from a creek of the tidal Thames. During high (spring) tides sluice gates are opened to allow river water to fill the pond via an underground channel. The pond is concreted, rectangular in shape and contains an important reed bed habitat which is vital for conservation and resident water birds. The pond is managed in partnership with the Friends of Kew Pond.

Buildings

Kew Green is also a street address. The odd-numbered buildings face the west side, and the even-numbered buildings face the east.

On the west side, Numbers 9–11, 17–25, 29–33, 49–51 and 55 Kew Green are all Grade II listed, as are Numbers 57–73, 77, and 83. On the east side, Numbers 2–4, 18–22, 52–56, 62–64, 90, and 96–106 Kew Green are all Grade II listed.

Also Grade II listed are some lamp standards, a Victorian sewer vent, a K6 red telephone box, and the cross-shaped war memorial near the church, all on the west side of Kew Green.

The Coach and Horses public house is at 8, Kew Green. Another public house, the Greyhound, is at 82, Kew Green. 79, Kew Green is also a public house, but has changed its name; for many years it was known as the Rose and Crown, but in 2013 it became the Cricketers. 85, Kew Green was once the King's Arms public house, but it has now become an Italian restaurant.

From 1964 until it folded in 1997, the Caxton Name Plate Manufacturing Company was based at 110, Kew Green. The company's name is still visible on the exterior of the building. At the back of Caxton House facing Westerley Ware is the Victorian mortuary building.

50, Kew Green was the original home of Kew's main primary school, the Queen's Church of England School, founded in 1824 as the King's School (the name of the school changes with the sex of the monarch). The building was rebuilt in 1887. In 1969 the school moved to new premises in Cumberland Road and the Victorian schoolhouse was demolished. To preserve its legacy, there is an embroidery of the original building in the pew cushions of St Anne's Church.

22, Kew Green was the home of the painter Arthur Hughes; and 49, Kew Green was the home of William Jackson Hooker and later of his son Joseph Dalton Hooker, both directors of Kew Gardens, and both now buried in St Anne's churchyard. Both properties have blue plaques.

Cambridge Cottage was built by Christopher Appleby, a barrister, in the early 18th century. It was leased by Lord Bute in 1758. In 1772 it was purchased by George III as a home for two of his sons and in 1838 it became the home of his seventh son,  the Duke of Cambridge (1774 – 1850), who extended the house. Prince George, Duke of Cambridge (1819 – 1904) owned the house after the death of his mother, The Duchess of Cambridge (1797 – 1889), and when he died in 1904 it was owned by Kew Gardens.

Gallery

See also
 Kew Bridge
 Kew Cricket Club
 Kew Gardens
 St Anne's Church, Kew
 Westerley Ware

References

Further reading
 140 pages. .
Moses. John: "Kew Green", The Kew Society, 2020

Bibliography
 

1730 establishments in England
Kew, London
Crown Estate
Cricket grounds in Surrey
Cricket grounds in London
Cricket in Surrey
Defunct cricket grounds in England
Defunct sports venues in Surrey
English cricket venues in the 18th century
History of Surrey
History of the London Borough of Richmond upon Thames
Houses in the London Borough of Richmond upon Thames
Parks and open spaces in the London Borough of Richmond upon Thames
Grade II listed buildings in the London Borough of Richmond upon Thames
Sport in the London Borough of Richmond upon Thames
Sport in Surrey
Sports venues completed in 1730
Sports venues in Surrey
Streets in the London Borough of Richmond upon Thames
Kew Green